Princess Royal Hospital may refer to:

 Princess Royal Hospital, Telford, a teaching hospital located in Apley Castle, Telford, England
 Princess Royal Hospital, Haywards Heath, an acute, teaching, general hospital located in Haywards Heath, West Sussex, England
 Princess Royal University Hospital, in Farnborough, London Borough of Bromley